The 1997 Limerick Senior Hurling Championship was the 103rd staging of the Limerick Senior Hurling Championship since its establishment by the Limerick County Board.

Patrickswell were the defending champions.

On 21 September 1997, Patrickswell won the championship after a 1-12 to 0-09 defeat of Garryspillane in the final. It was their third title in succession and their 16th title overall which allowed them to draw level with Ahane at the top of the all-time toll of honour.

Results

Final

References

Limerick Senior Hurling Championship
Limerick Senior Hurling Championship